Peter Immesberger (born 18 April 1960) is a retired West German weightlifter who was active between 1983 and 1992. He competed at the 1984 and 1988 Summer Olympics and finished in fourth and third place, respectively.

References

1960 births
Living people
German male weightlifters
Olympic weightlifters of West Germany
Weightlifters at the 1984 Summer Olympics
Weightlifters at the 1988 Summer Olympics
Olympic bronze medalists for West Germany
Olympic medalists in weightlifting
Medalists at the 1988 Summer Olympics
20th-century German people